Vani Vilas Women and Children Hospital  is a government run hospital in Bangalore, Karnataka, India. It is attached to the Bangalore Medical College and Research Institute.

It was built in 1935, at a cost of 4lakhs. The first medical superintendent was M. C. Albuquerque. It was renovated in 2002 at a cost of 4.2 crores.

In 2000, it was selected as one of the 11 AIDS control centres in India, and the sole one in Karnataka.

The Vani Vilas Hospital stands on the grounds where the Fort Church and the Fort Cemetery once stood. The Land was acquired from the Church of England by the Mysore Government. Land was provided at Hardinge Road, Chamarajpet as compensation, where now stands the St. Luke's Church.

Notable incidents
Indian movie superstar Rajnikanth was born at this hospital on 12 December 1950.

References

External links 
 

Hospital buildings completed in 1935
Hospitals in Bangalore
Women's hospitals
Children's hospitals in India
Teaching hospitals in India
1935 establishments in India
20th-century architecture in India